Swanborough Tump is a mound of earth in Manningford parish, Wiltshire, England. It has been considered to be a bowl barrow dating from the Bronze Age and is listed as a scheduled monument.

The mound was the meeting place of the ancient Swanborough Hundred and has been linked with the "Swanabeorh" of a 987 AD Saxon charter titled 'Barrow of the peasants'. Although recorded by Leslie Grinsell as a bowl barrow, the structure is untypical of a prehistoric burial mound and may instead have been built as a meeting-place during the Middle Ages.

This location is also significant as it was chosen in A.D. 871 as the meeting place for King Aethelred and his brother, the future King Alfred the Great on their way to fight the Danes. They promised each other that if one of them should die then the dead man's children would inherit land belonging to their father King Aethelwulf. A stone monument and plaque at the site commemorate this event.

References

Buildings and structures in Wiltshire
History of Wiltshire
Archaeological sites in Wiltshire
Barrows in England
Stone Age sites in Wiltshire
Scheduled monuments in Wiltshire